Deh-e Murd-e Olya (also Romanized as Deh-e Mūrd-e ‘Olyā; also known as Deh-e Mūrd and Mūrd) is a village in Sar Asiab-e Yusefi Rural District, Bahmai-ye Garmsiri District, Bahmai County, Kohgiluyeh and Boyer-Ahmad Province, Iran. At the 2006 census, its population was 81, in 12 families.

References 

Populated places in Bahmai County